Hesket is a locality in the Macedon Ranges Shire, in Victoria, Australia on the northern side of the Mount Macedon Range.
The settlement was originally known as Ferny Creek.

Hesket Post Office opened on 1 November 1866 and closed in 1971.

Today the locality consists of the Hesket Primary School (State School 1004) and the Hesket-Kerrie CFA fire station.

See also
 Woodend/Hesket Football Club

References

Towns in Victoria (Australia)
Shire of Macedon Ranges